Numushda (𒀭𒉡𒈲𒁕 Numušda) was a Mesopotamian god best known as the tutelary deity of the city Kazallu.

Character
The meaning of Numsushda's name is unknown. In an Akkadian astrological text it is explained as nammaššu, a word which depending on the context can mean "people," "settlement" or "wild animals," though other ancient proposed etymologies are known too.

He was regarded as a god of wild nature. His nature was sometimes regarded as violent, and in that capacity he was associated with storms (and by extension with the weather god Ishkur) and flooding.

Worship
Numushda is attested already in documents from the Early Dynastic, Akkadian and Ur III periods. His primary cult center, Kazallu, was likely located in the proximity of Marad and Kish in central Iraq. His temple located there was known as Kun4-sa-tu, "stairway to the mountain." He was also the tutelary god of Kiritab, located in the proximity of Kazallu, and had a prominent role in Marad. He also appears in personal names and offering lists from a number of other Mesopotamian cities, including Shuruppak, Lagash, Umma, Ur, as well as in Mari and Tuttul in Syria.

Association with other deities
Numushda was often regarded as the son of the moon god Nanna (Suen) and his wife Ningal, though this tradition is absent from sources from the third millennium BCE.

Assigning Numushda as a son to Nanna/Suen was likely meant to be a way to assimilate him into the pantheon of southern Mesopotamia, and might be based on perceived similarity to his another son, Ningublaga, though no direct syncretism between these two deities is attested in god lists.

A single source calls him a son of Enki, rather than Nanna and Ningal.

Numushda's wife was the goddess Namrat ("the shining"), who appears alongside him in the myth Marriage of Martu and in Lamentation over Sumer and Ur.

Lexical texts associate him with Martu and Shumugan.

References

Bibliography

External links
A hymn to Numušda for Sîn-iqīšam (Sîn-iqīšam A) in the Electronic Text Corpus of Sumerian Literature
The Marriage of Martu in the Electronic Text Corpus of Sumerian Literature

Mesopotamian gods
Sky and weather gods
Nature gods